Rāzna (Rēznas ezers) is the second largest water surface and the first in terms of water volume lake in Latvia. It is located in the eastern part of the country on the territory of Rēzekne Municipality, the water area of the lake is divided between Kaunatas, Mākoņkalna and Čornajas parishes.

The maximum depth reaches . In the late 80s - early 90s, the Committee for Environmental Protection drew attention to the deterioration of the ecological state of the lake. In 1999, funds were allocated for a project to create a nature park based on the lake. In 2001, local governments signed a protocol proposing the creation of the Rāzna National Park. In 2004, the official establishment of the Razna Natural Park takes place, which on January 1, 2007 will be transformed into the Rāzna National Park.

The lake is home to northern pike, stickleback, stone loach, european eel, tench, sander, perch, roach, peled, carp, crucian carp, common bleak, common bream, common rudd, vendace, ide, ruff, blicca bjoerkna  and some other fish species.

Two kilometers from the south-western shore of the lake there is Makonkalns hill, from which a view of the lake can be seen.

References

Rāzna